Academic rank (also scientific rank) is the rank of a scientist or teacher in a college, high school, university or research establishment. The academic ranks indicate relative importance and power of individuals in academia.
 
The academic ranks are specific for each country, there is no worldwide-unified ranking system. Among the common ranks are professor, associate professor (docent), assistant professor and instructor.
 
In most cases, the academic rank is automatically attached to a person at the time of employment in a position with the same name, and deprived when a working relation is expired. Therefore the term "academic rank" usually means the same as "position in academia".
 
However in some countries the terms "position" and "academic rank" are not synonyms. So in modern Russia there exist the docent and professor ranks, whereas the set of positions in academia is broader. The academic rank is conferred only after the person has been successfully working in the docent or professor position for a certain period (and later underwent a centralized control procedure), i.e. not at enrollment, and is kept for life.

The list of academic ranks below identifies the hierarchical ranking structure found amongst scholars and personnel in academia. The lists below refer specifically to colleges and universities throughout the world, although other institutions of higher learning may follow a similar schema.

Afghanistan
Ranks in universities of Afghanistan are listed below according to the Ministry of Higher Education (MoHE) of Afghanistan. These ranks are issued stepwise by the MoHE after some procedures, a period of service and conditions.
Lecturer or Assistant Professor (in Pashto پوهنیار)
Senior Assistant Professor (in Pashto پوهنمل)
Associate Professor (in Pashto پوهندوی)
Senior Associate professor (in Pashto پوهنوال)
Professor (in Pashto پوهاند)

Honorary degree:
Distinguished Professor (in Pashto لوی پوهاند)

Term of address in general: ostād or استاد

Algeria
Academic ranks
 Professeur / Professeur hospitalo-universitaire (أستاذ / أستاذ إستشفائي-جامعي ), equivalent to Professor 
 Maître de Conférences, classe A / Maître de Conférences hospitalo-universitaire, classe A (أستاذ محاضر قسم أ/أستاذ محاضر إستشفائي-جامعي قسم أ), equivalent to Assistant Professor (Level A)
 Maître de Conférences, classe B / Maître de Conférences hospitalo-universitaire, classe B (أستاذ محاضر قسم أ/أستاذ محاضر إستشفائي-جامعي قسم ب), equivalent to Assistant Professor (Level B)
 Maître Assistant, classe A / Maître Assistant hospitalo-universitaire, classe A (أستاذ مساعد قسم أ/أستاذ مساعد إستشفائي-جامعي قسم أ), equivalent to Lecturer (Level A)
 Maître Assistant, classe B (أستاذ مساعد قسم ب), equivalent to Lecturer (Level B)

Research only
 Directeur de recherche
 Maître de Recherche, classe A
 Maître de Recherche, classe B
 Chargé de Recherche
 Attaché de Recherche

Administrative ranks
 Rector
 Vice-Rector
 Dean
 Vice-Dean
 Head of department

Argentina

Tenured positions:
 Profesor Titular Ordinario, or Profesor Titular Regular. A tenured, full professor position.
 Profesor Asociado Ordinario, or Profesor Asociado Regular. A tenured, associate professor position.
 Profesor Adjunto Ordinario, or Profesor Adjunto Regular. A tenured, adjunct professor position.

Australia

 Distinguished Professor, Emeritus Professor, and other professorships with highest honour and contributions to knowledge and society.
 Level E – Professor, or Professorial or Senior Principal Research Fellow; equivalent to Distinguished/Endowed Professor (USA) or Professor (UK).
 Level D – Associate Professor, or Principal Research Fellow if research intensive; equivalent to Reader/Associate Professor at a UK university.
 Level C – Senior Lecturer, or Senior Research Fellow if research intensive; equivalent to Senior/Principal Lecturer at a UK university.
 Level B – Lecturer, or Research Fellow if research intensive; Level B is the first tenured academic rank, normally requires at minimum, completion of a PhD.
 Level A - Associate Lecturer, or Associate Fellow if research intensive.

There are often multiple bands or steps for each Level (e.g. Level B - 6 steps, Level C - 6 steps, Level D - 4 steps). For example, an academic who earns the title of Level D has progressed through 12 bands/steps of previous academic service or the equivalent in accumulated academic achievements. There is only one step for Level E. An academic cannot automatically progress from Level B, Step 6, to Level C, Step 1, without a formal application for promotion, which is typically a peer reviewed process.

Bangladesh
Teachers are categorized in four main classes in Bangladesh at the university level. The ascending ranks of teachers are Lecturer, Assistant Professor, Associate Professor and Professor. University lecturers are normally required to hold a Master's degree. After obtaining a PhD, the appointment starts with assistant professor, then gradually associate professor and professor depending on research/teaching experience. Beside these, the title of emeritus is given to extraordinary professors after their retirement.
 Professor emeritus
 Professor
 Associate professor
 Assistant professor
 Lecturer
 Demonstrator

Belarus
Academic ranks
 Prafiesar / Прафесар (Full professor)
 Dacent / Дацэнт (Associate professor)
 Starejšy vykladčyk / Старэйшы выкладчык (Senior lecturer)
 Asistent / Vykladčyk / Асістэнт / Выкладчык (Assistant professor / Lecturer)

Researchers by seniority levels
 Haloŭny navukovy supracoŭnik / Галоўны навуковы супрацоўнік (Chief Researcher)
 Viadučy navukovy supracoŭnik / Вядучы навуковы супрацоўнік (Leading Researcher)
 Starejšy navukovy supracoŭnik / Старэйшы навуковы супрацоўнік (Senior Researcher)
 Navukovy supracoŭnik / Навуковы супрацоўнік (Researcher)
 Malodšy navukovy supracoŭnik / Малодшы навуковы супрацоўнік (Junior Researcher)

Administrative ranks
 Rektar / Рэктар, rector
 Prarektar / Прарэктар, vice-rector
 Dekan fakultetа / Дэкан факультэта, dean of the faculty
 Namiesnik dekana / Намеснік дэкана, vice-dean
 Zahadčyk kafiedry / Загадчык кафедры, head of department

Belgium
Dutch speaking community
  (full professor, full-time) (professor ordinarius)
  -  (full professor, part-time) (previously: professor extraordinarius)
  (professor, reader)
 II (associate professor, principal lecturer)
  I (associate professor, senior lecturer)
  (assistant professor, lecturer)
  (researcher, must have a PhD)
  (research assistant, can be enrolled in a PhD or be in the postdoc phase)
  (research fellow, enrolled in a PhD degree, appointed by the Fund for Scientific Research FWO)

Administrative ranks:
 Rector
 Vice-Rector
 Decaan (dean, i.e. head of a faculty)

French speaking community
  (full professor)
  (visiting professor in Switzerland, part-time professor in Belgium)
  (professor)
  (associate professor, tenured)
  (associate professor, tenure-track)
  (visiting assistant professor, non-tenured)
  (research director / senior research associate, appointed by National Fund for Scientific Research F.R.S.-FNRS)
  (senior researcher, with Ph.D. and previously with teaching aggregation)
  (senior researcher / senior research associate, with Ph.D., appointed by National Fund for Scientific Research F.R.S.-FNRS, tenured)
  (senior researcher, with Ph.D.)
  (senior researcher / research associate, with Ph.D., appointed by federal research council FNRS, tenured)
  (senior research assistant / junior lecturer, with Ph.D.)
  (volunteer lecturer, unpaid, non-tenured)
  (lecturer, without Ph.D., paid by the hour, non-tenured)
  (appointed by National Fund for Scientific Research F.R.S.-FNRS)
  (research assistant)
  (research fellow, enrolled in a Ph.D. degree, appointed by National Fund for Scientific Research F.R.S.-FNRS)

Administrative ranks:
 Recteur (president of university)
 Vice-Recteur
 Doyen (dean, i.e. head of a faculty, elected)
 Président d'institut (director of research institute, elected)
 Vice-Doyen (vice-dean, i.e. head of studies in a faculty)
 Président de département (department head, elected)

Bosnia and Herzegovina
  – full professor (Must hold PhD or Doctorate and have experience of minimum of seven years as a Vanredni profesor)
  – associate professor (Must hold PhD or Doctorate and have experience of minimum of five years as a Docent)
  – assistant professor (Must hold PhD or Doctorate Degree. Relevant working experience could be required as well)
  – senior teaching assistant (Must hold at least Masters Degree with excellent grades. Relevant working experience could be required as well)
  – teaching assistant (Must hold Undergraduate Degree with excellent grades. Relevant working experience could be required as well)

Administrative ranks
  – rector / chancellor / president / head of university
  – prorector / vice-chancellor / vice president / assistant head of university
  – dean / head of faculty or school at the university
  – vice-dean / assistant head of faculty or school at the university
  – head of department

Honorary ranks
  – professor emeritus

Brazil

There is no official academic ranking in Brazilian private universities. However, most of the public Federal Universities apply the following (from the highest position to the lowest one):
 Professor Emérito (professor emeritus)
 Professor Titular (full professor) – PhD required
 Professor Associado (associate professor) – PhD required
 Professor Adjunto (assistant professor) – PhD required
 Professor Assistente (lecturer) – only a master's degree is required
 Professor Auxiliar (assistant lecturer) – no post-graduation degree is required
 Professor Substituto ou Temporário (temporary lecturer)

Bulgaria
 Professor/Full Professor – Професор
 Docent/Associate Professor – Доцент 
 Chief/Senior Assistant Professor – Главен Асистент
 Assistant Professor – Асистент

 University

 Assistant Professor – Асистент
 Chief/Senior Assistant Professor – Главен Асистент
 Docent/Associate Professor – Доцент
 Professor/Full Professor – Професор

 Academy of Sciences

 Scientist III: after Master thesis or Diploma, equal to Assistant
 Scientist II: after Doctoral thesis/PhD/Dissertation, after Dr. Grade (3–5 or 7 years work after Master), equal Chef Assistant, *Associate or Post Doc
 Scientist I: After second Post Doc (1 or 2 years work after PhD/Dr), equal Senior Assistant or Senior Associate.
 Senior Scientist I: after PhD (USA, UK....) or Doctoral dissertation/thesis (France, Germany, Russia...) and some years of  *Post-Doc, equal of Assoc. Prof.
 Senior Scientist II: after Habilitation, equal to Professor
 Full Professor

 Higher administration of the academy of sciences

 Member of correspondence for the Academy of Science (after professor/habilitation), very rare
 Academic: after member of correspondence (for the entire of Bulgaria).

 Administrative ranks

 Rector
 Vice-rectors
 Assistant rector
 Secretary general
 Academic ombudsman

Canada

Faculty (teaching staff)
 Professor emeritus or university professor emeritus, a retired professor still active in research; Fr professeur émérite
 Endowed chair professor (e.g. Canada Research Chair professor - Tier 1), a distinguished full professor with endowment
 Professor or full professor (research professor, professor of practice, visiting professor, adjunct professor, professor emeritus; Fr professeur titulaire)
 Associate professor (research associate professor, visiting associate professor, adjunct associate professor; Fr professeur agrégé)
 Senior Lecturer (teaching professor)
 Assistant professor (research assistant professor, adjunct assistant professor; Fr professeur adjoint)
 Lecturer or instructor (sessional lecturer or sessional instructor; Fr chargé de cours)

Assistant professor is the entry-level rank for non-tenured members of faculty.

Non-faculty teaching and research personnel
 Senior fellow, senior research fellow or senior scientist / Fr chercheur sénior
 Fellow, research fellow or scientist / Fr chercheur
 Research supervisor or principal investigator / Fr directeur de recherche
 Research associate or postdoctoral associate / Fr associé de recherche
 Research assistant or teaching assistant / Fr auxiliaire de recherche

Administrative ranks
 Dean (often also full professors)
 Associate dean (often also full professors)
 Directors of administrative departments
 Associate/assistant directors of administrative departments
 Chairmen of academic departments (usually full professors)
 Graduate Coordinators
 Undergraduate Coordinators

China

 Senior ranks
 Academic track: Professor（教授）
 Research track: Researcher（研究员）
 Vice-Senior ranks
 Academic track: Associate Professor（副教授）
 Research track: Associate Researcher（副研究员）
 Medium ranks
 Academic track: Assistant Professor（助理教授）or Lecturer（讲师）
 Research track: Assistant Researcher（助理研究员）
 Junior ranks
 Academic track: Assistant Lecturer（助教）
 Research track: Intern-Researcher（实习研究员）

Colombia

Costa Rica
 Emeritus or Distinguished professor (Profesor Emérito)
 Professor (Profesor Catedrático)
 Associate professor (Profesor Asociado)
 Adjunct professor (Profesor Adjunto)
 Instructor professor (Profesor Instructor)
 Visiting professor (Profesor Visitante)
The list above presents the ranks used by University of Costa Rica for their academic regime. However, there are no formal or legal academic ranks in Costa Rica.
Each university decides their own names. For example in University of Costa Rica the highest rank is 'Profesor Catedrático' and it requires no more than a 5 year "licencitatura" degree and 15 years of teaching/researching and 16 publications (https://www.ucr.ac.cr/docencia/personal-docente.html). Most other universities have no similar framework and the title Professor is used unregulated by anyone.

Croatia
 Redoviti profesor u trajnom zvanju equivalent to distinguished professor (prof. dr. sc. Name Surname)
 Redoviti profesor equivalent to full professor (prof. dr. sc. Name Surname)
 Izvanredni profesor equivalent to associate professor (izv. prof. dr. sc. Name Surname)
 Docent equivalent to assistant professor (doc. dr. sc. Name Surname)
 Viši asistent equivalent to postdoctoral fellow/researcher (dr. sc. Name Surname)
 Asistent equivalent to teaching/research assistant, usually a doctoral student
 Viši predavač equivalent to senior lecturer
 Predavač equivalent to lecturer

Honorary academic rank
 Professor emeritus – awarded to some professors in retirement

Administrative ranks
 Rektor equivalent to rector, head of university (in USA equivalent to president of university)
 Prorektor equivalent to prorector, assistant to head of university (in USA equivalent to vice-president of university)
 Dekan equivalent to dean, head of faculty or school in university
 Prodekan equivalent to vice-dean, assistant to dean
 Pročelnik odsjeka equivalent to department chairman
 Predstojnik zavoda/katedre equivalent to head of department

Cuba
Tenured:

 Professor(full/part-time, PhD required)
 Associate Professor(full/part-time, PhD mostly required)
 Assistant Professor(full/part-time)
 Lecturer (Instructor)(full/part-time)

Cyprus
Tenure-track faculty positions

 Professor
 Associate professor
 Assistant professor
 Lecturer

Non-tenure track positions
 Special teaching personnel
 Special scientists

Czech Republic

Denmark

Egypt

Teachers are categorized in five main classes in Egypt at university level. The ascending rank of teacher is Demonstrator, Assistant Lecturer, Lecturer, Associate Professor and Professor. The initial position Demonstrator is generally enrolled as the top student of the class. Master's degree is required for university level Assistant Lecturer. After PhD, the appointment starts with Lecturer, then gradually Associate Professor and Professor depending on research/teaching experience. Beside these, professor of Emeritus is given to extraordinary professor after their retirement.

 OSTADH MOTAFAREGH (أستاذ متفرغ), equivalent to Professor Emeritus
 OSTADH (أستاذ) (the "DH" pronounced like the "TH" in the word "THE"), equivalent to Professor (usually after minimum of five years serving as OSTATH MOSAED as well as publishing certain number of research papers)
 OSTADH (the "DH" pronounced like the "TH" in the word "THE") MOSAED (أستاذ مساعد), equivalent to Associate Professor
 MODARRES (مدرس), equivalent to Assistant Professor (must have a PhD degree)
 MODARRES MOSA'ED (مدرس مساعد), Lecturer (must have a master's degree)
 MOA'ED (معيد), or Teaching Assistant- also called demonstrator- (must have a bachelor's degree; usually graduated top of the class)

Estonia
 Emeriitprofessor (Professor emeritus)
 Professor
 Kaasprofessor (Associate professor)
 Lektor (Lecturer)
 Õpetaja (Teacher)

Finland

In Finland, there is less distinction between graduates and undergraduates: university students may be employed as research assistants (tutkimusapulainen) before they graduate with a master's degree. A person pursuing a doctoral degree must already hold a Master's degree, and is typically employed by the university, or enjoys a similar grant, and will be called väitöskirjatutkija (doctoral researcher), nuorempi tutkija (early career researcher), or tohtorikoulutettava (doctoral student). Besides post-doctoral researchers (tutkijatohtori) and senior teaching assistants (yliassistentti), there are several mid-level non-professorial positions, such as teaching researcher (opettava tutkija). Senior teachers and researchers may be employed as, e.g., erikoistutkija (special researcher) or yliopistotutkija (senior research fellow). Docent (dosentti) is a non-professorial rank and title (for life) awarded to academics qualified as a principal investigator and for supervision of doctoral students; however, they do not belong to the professor corps and may be employed elsewhere. Professors (professori) are understood as research group leaders and managers, and traditionally there is no direct equivalent of an assistant/associate/full professor career path, although Aalto University is introducing these. Qualifications for a professor's position are earned as a docent or in other mid-career positions. In management, professors serve as department heads (laitosjohtaja or osastonjohtaja) and deans (head of the faculty, dekaani). The leader of a university is called a rector (rehtori), assisted by multiple vice-rectors (vararehtori). Vice-rectors may retain their professor positions or work full-time as a vice-rector. Some universities have an even more senior officer called Chancellor (kansleri), who is more concerned with outreach and public relations than daily management.

France

In French business schools, ranks are the same as in the United States: Assistant Professor, Associate Professor, and finally (Full) Professor.

Germany

A simplified overview of academic ranks in Germany:

Appointment grades
  (Pay grade: W3 or W2)
  (W3)
  (W2)
  (W2, only in Baden-Württemberg) – although paid like a professor appointed at level W2, lecturers in this position do not have a professor title; the term was formerly used in all states for senior lecturer positions with research and teaching responsibilities (C2, being phased out since 2002)
  (not tenured, only rarely with tenure track) (W1)
  (not tenured) (W1, only in Baden-Württemberg)
  (TVöD 13/14/15, TvL 13/14/15)
  (TVöD, TvL A13 a. Z.)
  (TVöD, only in Baden-Württemberg)
  (TdL)
  (TdL)

Non-appointment grades
 
  – conferred, in some German states, to a Privatdozent who has been in service for several years, without formally being appointed as professor.

Greece 
 Professor Emeritus [ (male) /  (female)]. Αn honorary title for people at the rank of Professor who have reached the legal age for retirement; If they wish, they have the right, for a limited time after retirement, to continue their research projects. 
 Professor [ (male) /  (female)].
 Associate Professor [ (male) /  (female)].
 Assistant Professor [ (male) /  (female)].
 Laboratory Teaching Staff member []. Holders of a doctoral degree (Ph.D). that are members of this rank can independently teach courses, same as the Teaching Research Staff [] (i.e., professors ranks) members do. All members can be instructors in laboratories.

Administrative ranks (Universities and Technical Universities)
 Rector.
 Vice-rector.
 Secretary General [ (male) /  (female)].
 Dean
 Deputy Dean [ (male) /  (female)].
 Chairman of the Department.
 Deputy Chairman of the Department.
 Director of the Section [ (male) /  (female)].

The holders of administrative ranks must be Professors or Associate Professors. The only exception is Secretary General, who is not a faculty member.

Administrative ranks (former Technological Educational Institutes; defunct)

The Technological Educational Institutes (TEI) (1983–2019)  were reformed between 2013 and 2019 and their departments incorporated into existing universities. 
 President.
 Vice-president.
 Secretary General [ (male) /  (female)].
 Director of the School ( (male) /  (female)).
 Supervisor of the Department [ (male) /  (female)].
 Director of the Section [ (male) /  (female)].

The holders of administrative ranks must be Professors or Associate Professors.

Defunct Academic Staff Ranks
 Adjunct Assistant Professor [ (male) / ]. A temporary employee with a short-term contract, usually for one term (semester), usually holder of a doctoral degree (Ph.D). as described in the Greek Presidential Decree 407/1980 published in the Government Gazette 112/A/9-5-1980. Adjunct Assistant Professors are sometimes called simply as "407" or "P.D. 407", after the number of the Decree.
 Lecturer (1982‒2011) [defunct; in universities and technical universities:  (both male and female) / in technological educational institutes:  (male) /  (female)] it had founded by the law 1268/1982 Government Gazette 87/A/16-7-1982 and it was abolished, defunct, by the law 4009/2011 Government Gazette 195/A/6-9-2011. 
 Teaching Assistant was abolished in 1982, but people holding it remain teaching assistants until retirement.
 Adjunct Lecturer [ (male) /  (female)] was abolished.

Guyana
 Professor Emeritus (on retirement)
 Professor
 Reader
 Senior Lecturer
 Lecturer II
 Lecturer I
 Assistant Lecturer
 Tutor
 Laboratory Demonstrator

Administrative ranks
 Chancellor
 Vice-chancellor/president
 Deputy vice-chancellor
 Registrar
 Bursar
 Deputy Registrar
 Deans of Faculties
 Heads of Departments/Schools

Hong Kong

In the past, Hong Kong followed the British system (4 levels). In recent years it is moving towards the North American counterpart, with the titles renamed to their corresponding equivalence (professor (professor), associate professor (professor/reader), and assistant professor (senior-)lecturer)). Hong Kong's universities usually differ between professorial grades (end- or mid-career research and teaching positions) and lecturers (entry or mid-career positions - in the UK called either teaching fellows or lecturers, and "Mittelbau" in German-speaking countries). Depending on institutions, the title of "professor" is assumed by chair professors and professors, or assistant professors and above.

Academic ranks
 Chair professor
 Emeritus professor
 Professor
 Associate professor
 Assistant professor
 Senior Lecturer 
 Lecturer
 Assistant Lecturer 
 Research assistant professor
 Post-doctoral fellow
 Adjunct (associate/assistant) professor
 Honorary (associate/assistant) professor
 Professional consultant or teaching consultant/fellow
 Research associate
 Research assistant and teaching assistant (or tutor, instructor, demonstrator)
 Postgraduate or graduate
 Undergraduate

Administrative ranks
 Chancellor (titular, normally the Chief Executive (formerly the Governor) of Hong Kong) or president in the Hong Kong Shue Yan University
 Pro-chancellor (titular, only for the University of Hong Kong and the Hong Kong University of Science and Technology)
 Vice-chancellor or president (or vice president principal in the Hong Kong Shue Yan University): being the chief executive of the institution
 Deputy vice-chancellor (as the first among pro-vice-chancellors in the University of Hong Kong)
 Pro-vice-chancellors or vice-presidents or deputy presidents
 Associate pro-vice-chancellors (as in the Chinese University of Hong Kong) or Associate vice-president (as in the Hong Kong Baptist University, the Lingnan University, the Hong Kong Shue Yan University, and the Hong Kong Institute of Education)
 Registrar
 Provost (for some universities)
 Deans of faculties / schools
 Heads (or directors) of departments / schools

Hungary

 Professzor/egyetemi tanár (university professor/full professor)
 főiskolai tanár (college professor)
 Docens (associate professor)
 Adjunktus (assistant professor)
 Tanársegéd (assistant lecturer)

Iceland
In Icelandic universities, particularly at the University of Iceland, prófessor is the most senior ranking teaching position. Below prófessor is dósent, then lektor. This three step hierarchy is akin to the US-scale, of full-, associate- and assistant-professors. Until the early 1990s no upward mobility was available in the Icelandic system. Most university teachers were hired as "prófessor." A "dósent" or a "lektor" wishing to ascend to a higher rank had to apply for a new position when it became available. Currently (since the 1990s) much more university teachers are hired as junior rank "lektor" and are promoted to "dósent" and "prófessor" if their work proves worthy of it.

Research and teaching career pathway
 Prófessor (Professor), from Latin professor
 Dósent (Associate Professor), from Latin doceō
 Lektor (Assistant Professor), from Latin lēctor

Research career pathway
 Vísindamaður (Scientist)
 Fræðimaður (Scholar)
 Sérfræðingur (Specialist)

India

Regular Academic ranks (Hierarchy from top): Academic institutions in India have the mandate of teaching, training and research. This also includes research universities.
 Professor
 Associate Professor
 Assistant Professor
 In addition to these, there are government sponsored fellowships  awarded to able candidates for a 5-year contract period during which they are hosted by an academic or research organisation. Their primary function is to carry out high quality original research. They may become a regular faculty as an assistant professor or associate professor during this period subject to their performance.
 Assistant Professor (on contract) / Ad hoc faculty – They are primarily involved in teaching for a limited contract period typically 6 months – 1 year. 
Research ranks (Hierarchy from top): Research institutions such as national labs have a different kind of hierarchy and are primarily concerned with basic and applied research. They guide Ph.D. students in their research thesis but do not grant degrees. In most cases the Ph.D. candidates are registered with another university which grants the degree. Awarding of degree is subjected to meeting the same criteria as Ph.D. guided by university professors.
 Scientist H
 Scientist G
 Scientist F
 Scientist E (in some cases EII)
 Scientist D (in some cases EI)
 Scientist C 
 Scientist B
Non-faculty ranks
 Research associate (postdoctoral fellows/inspire faculty)
 Senior research fellow (Ph.D. students after completing two years of course work and research)
 Junior research fellow (Newly joined Ph.D. candidates)
Administrative ranks in universities
 Chancellor
 Vice chancellor
 Pro vice chancellor
 Deans / directors
 Chairmen / HODs / wardens
Administrative ranks in research institutions
 Director general
 Director
 Chairman of departments / divisions

Indonesia
Academic ranks

According to the Joint Regulations of the Ministry of Education And Culture And Head of National Civil Service Agency No 4/VIII/PB/2014;  No 24 Year 2014 and the Regulation of Ministry of Administrative and Bureaucratic Reform No. 46 Year 2013 and No. 17 Year 2013 Article 6; and the Ministry of Research, Technology, and Higher Education decree No. 164/ M/ KPT/ 2019, the academic ranks (Jabatan Fungsional) for lecturer (university-based) and researcher (non-university) are

Academic ranks for lecturers
 Dosen (Lecturer)
Asisten Ahli (Assistant Professor - Lower)
 Lektor (Assistant Professor - Upper)
 Lektor Kepala (Associate Professor)
 Guru Besar, Profesor (Professor)

Academic ranks for researchers
 Peneliti Pertama (Junior Researcher)
 Peneliti Ahli Muda (Associate Researcher)
 Peneliti Ahli Madya (Senior Researcher)
 Peneliti Ahli Utama (Research Professor)

Administrative ranks  (university)
 Rektor (Rector)
 Wakil Rektor (Vice Rector)
 Dekan (Dean)
 Wakil Dekan (Vice Dean)
 Kepala Program Studi (Head of Department)

Iran
Holders of bachelor's degree when granted to teach in a college:
 Assistant instructor (transliteration: "morabbi-e āmuzešyār")

Holders of master's degrees when granted to teach in a college:
 Instructor (in Persian: , transliteration: morabbi) 
 Lecturer (in Persian: , transliteration: modarres)

Holders of Ph.D. degrees:
 Assistant professor (in Persian: , transliteration: ostādyār) 
 Associate professor (in Persian: , transliteration: dānešyār) 
 (Full) Professor (in Persian: , transliteration: ostād (tamām)) 
 Distinguished Professor (in Persian: , transliteration: ostād-e momtāz')

Terms of address in general: ostādEmeritus ranks Emeritus professor
 FellowAdministrative ranks President
 Chancellor
 Dean
 Head of department.

Iraq
Holders of master's degrees can be (in ascending order):
 Assistant lecturer (in )
 Lecturer
 Assistant professor
 Professor
Holders of PhD degrees can be (in ascending order):
 Lecturer
 Assistant professor
 Professor
Note: Holders of PhD degrees are automatically promoted to lecturer if they were assistant lecturers before they received their PhD.

  equivalent to professor.
  equivalent to associate professor.
  equivalent to assistant professor in American Universities (with PhD) or with researches.
  Assistant lecturer (without PhD).

Israel

Academic:

 Professor Emeritus
 Professor Min Haminyan (Full Professor)
 Professor Chaver (Associate Professor)
 Senior Lecturer
 Lecturer

Administrative Ranks:

 President
 Rector
 Dean
 Department Chairman

Italy

Tenured positions (confermato):
 Professore Ordinario, or Professore di I fascia. A tenured, full professor position.
 Professore Associato, or Professore di II fascia. A tenured, associate professor position.
 Professore Aggregato. A 'ricercatore confermato' who is in charge of teaching university classes.
 Ricercatore confermato. A tenured position as researcher or assistant professor.

Non-tenured positions (non confermato):
 Professore Straordinario, also Professore di I fascia. A three-year full professor appointment leading to tenure.
 Professore Associato non confermato, also Professore di II fascia. A three-year associate professor appointment leading to tenure at associate level.
 Ricercatore non confermato. A three-year position at assistant professor/researcher/lecturer level.
 Ricercatore a tempo determinato di tipo B. A three-year position at assistant professor/researcher/lecturer level, leading to the Professore Associato position.
 Ricercatore a tempo determinato di tipo A. A three-year position (one possible two-year renewal) at assistant professor/researcher/lecturer level.
 Assegnista di Ricerca. A research fellow with a fixed-term appointment.

Honorary titles as Professore Emerito and  Professore Onorario also exist and are typically appointed to illustrious academics after retirement.

In Italian universities the role of "Professore a contratto" (literally "Contract Professor") is paid at the end of the academic year nearly €3000 for the entire academic year, without salary during the academic year.  In 2020 there are 23 thousand Associate Professors and 28 thousand "Professori a contratto" in Italy. Associate Professors have a salary of around 35,000 euros per year, Full Professors have a salary of 50,000 euros per year, and Contract Professors of around 3,000 euros per year.

Jamaica
 Professor Emeritus
 Professor
 Senior Lecturer (Tenured)
 Lecturer (Tenured/Tenure track)
 Assistant Lecturer
 Instructor
 Tutor
 Graduate/Research Assistant

Japan
Tenured or non-tenured faculty

The ranking is as follows:
  - Professor emeritus
  - (Full) Professor
 , previously  - Associate professor
  - Lecturer / Junior associate professor / Instructor / Assistant professor
 , previously  - Assistant professor / Research Associate

The Japanese system includes non-tenure, term-limited,  positions at all ranks, including professor. These are referred to as  positions and officially include tokunin in the title.Limited tenure track positions (similar to the United States) have recently been introduced. In this system  corresponds to assistant professor in the U.S.

A major difference between the U. S. System and Japan is that granting of tenure and promotion to associate professor are not linked; one may be tenured yet remain an assistant professor. Advancing upward typically requires a higher-level post to be vacated, even in the new tenure-track system.

Jordan

 Assistant Prof
 Associate Prof
 Prof

Myanmar

Rector

Pro-Rector I

Pro-Rector II

Pro-Rector III

Professor (Head of Department)

Professor I

Professor

Associate Professor

Lecturer

Assistant Lecturer

Tutor/ Demonstrator

Latvia
Administrative positions:
 Rektors (male), Rektore (female) (rector)
 Dekāns (male), Dekāne (female) (dean), head of a faculty (human sciences, natural sciences etc.)
 Nodaļas vadītājs (male) Nodaļas vadītāja (female) (department manager), head of a department (computer science, mathematics etc.)

Academic positions:
 Profesors (male) Profesore (female) Professor
 Asociētais profesors (male) Asociētā profesore (female) associate professor
 Docents (male), Docente (female) (assistant professor), usually almost the same teaching/research/administration division as professor, Doctoral Degree required
 Lektors (male), Lektore (female) Lecturer. Requires MA degree
 Asistents (male), Asistente (female) research or teaching assistant

Lebanon
Academic positions at the Lebanese American University:
 Instructor
 Senior Instructor
 Lecturer
 Assistant Professor
 Associate Professor
 Professor
 Distinguished Professor

Libya
 Professor (أستاذ)
 Associate professor (أستاذ مشارك)
 Assistant professor (أستاذ مساعد)
 Lecturer (محاضر) 
 Assistant Lecturer (محاضر مساعد)

Lithuania
 Professor,  (male) /  (female)
 Associate professor,  (male) /  (female)
 Lecturer,  (male) /  (female)
 Assistant lecturer,  (male) /  (female)

Macau
At the University of Macau there are nine levels of faculty rank, namely
 Chairman professor,
 Distinguished professor,
 Professor,
 Associate professor,
 Assistant professor
 Senior lecturer
 Lecturer
 Senior instructor
 Instructor

At the Macao Polytechnic University there are four levels
 Professor (Professor coordenador)
 Associate professor (Professor adjuncto)
 Lecturer (Assistente)
 Teaching Assistant (Assistent estagiario)

North Macedonia
 Demonstrator, Демонстратор-(Graduate employee in a university)
 Younger assistant, Помлад Асистент-(B.Sc.)
 Assistant, Асистент-(M.Sc.)
 Docent, Доцент-(Assistant professor)
 Vonreden Professor, Вонреден Професор-(associate professor)
 Professor, Професор-(full-time professor)
 Professor emeritus, Пензиониран Професор-(retired professor)
 Academic, Академик-(academician)

Administrative positions:
 Pomlad referent, Помлад референт- (Younger Civil Servant) -High School Diploma
 Referent, Референт- (Civil Servant) -High School Diploma
 Postar Referent, Постар Референт- (Senior Civil Servant) -High School Diploma 
 Pomlad Sorabotnik, Помлад Соработник- (Younger Associate) -Associate Degree 
 Sorabotnik, Соработник- (Аssociate) -Associate Degree 
 Postar Sorabotnik, Постар Соработник- (Senior Associate) -Associate Degree 
 Rakovoditel na studentski prasanja, Раководител на студентски прашања- (Head of Students Affairs) -Bachelor's degree 
 Rakovoditel na katedra/institut, Раководител на катедра/институт- (Head of Department/Institute) -Ph.D. 
 Prodekan, Продекан- (Vice Dean) -Ph.D. 
 Dekan, Декан- (Dean) -Ph.D. 
 Prorektor, Проректор- (Vice Rector) -Ph.D. 
 Rektor, Ректор- (Rector) -Ph.D.

Malaysia

In general for most public universities in Malaysia: 

 Professor
 Associate Professor
 Senior Lecturer
 Lecturer

Malta
 Professor
 Associate Professor
 Senior Lecturer
 Lecturer
 Assistant Lecturer

Mexico
The ranking system in most Mexican public universities is as follows
  A (early assistant professor)
  B (assistant professor)
  C (early associate professor)
  A (associate professor)
  B (full professor)
  C (senior full professor)
  (equivalent to distinguished professor, not to be confused with emeritus professor)
Usually Mexican academics are also fellows of the Sistema Nacional de Investigadores (SNI) that has four levels (candidate, I, II and III) that more or less correlate (but are not equivalent) to the Asociado and Titular A, B, and C professorships. The rank as professor is determined by the individual's institution while the SNI level is determined by an independent committee that evaluates the researchers nationwide.

Many universities and research institutions make a distinction between "Profesores" -Professors- and "Investigadores" -Researchers- (Asociado A, B, C, Titular A, B, C), the main difference is that "Profesores" have a higher load of teaching, while "Investigadores" have a higher load of research, but normally all of them take part in both activities and are considered equivalent.

Research rankings are awarded by the Sistema Nacional de Investigadores which depends on the national research council (Conacyt):
 SNI emeritus researcher (not necessarily higher rank but lifetime, requires 15 continuous years as SNI III)
 SNI III researcher (about 7% of the researchers in SNI)
 SNI II researcher (about 16% of the researchers in SNI)
 SNI I researcher (about 59% of researchers in SNI)
 SNI candidate researcher (C) (about 18% of researchers in SNI)

All titles, both professors and researchers, can be given in a:
 Full-time, or
 Part-time basis

Administrative academic positions:
 Rector or Presidente (Chancellor, Chief Executive Officer)
 Secretario Académico (Provost, Chief Academic Officer)
 Director of Faculty or College (Dean)
 Coordinator (Chair)

MoroccoAcademic Positions1. Professeur d'Enseignement Supérieur

2. Professeur Habilité à Diriger les Recherches (supervise les recherches)

3. Professeur Assistant (co-encadre les recherches)Before Academic Position1. Docteur

2. Doctorant

NepalAcademic Positions1. Professor Emeritus

2. Professor

3. Associate professor/Reader

4. Assistant Professor

5. Lecturer

6. Teaching Assistant

7. Instructor

8. Technical support staffAdministrative Positions Chancellor 
 Pro-chancellor 
 Vice-chancellor 
 Rector
 Registrar
 Deans of School
 Heads of department
 Program Coordinator

Netherlands

New Zealand

NigeriaAcademic Positions Emeritus Professor (retired)
 Professor
 Associate Professor / Reader
 Senior Lecturer
 Lecturer I
 Lecturer II
 Assistant Lecturer
 Graduate AssistantAdministrative Positions Chancellor 
 Pro-chancellor 
 Vice-chancellor 
 Deputy vice-chancellor
 Pro-vice-chancellor
 Deans of faculties (some are referred to as provost)
 Sub-deans of faculties
 Heads of departments/schools
 Department/school directors of studies

Norway

Pakistan
The hiring of academic positions in public universities throughout Pakistan is managed by the Higher Education Commission of Pakistan, the requirement for all positions vary with respect to the field of studies e.g. Engineering, IT, Medical, Law, and Arts and Design.

There are four faculty ranks lecturer, assistant professor, associate professor, and professor.

In engineering public universities, a lecturer requires an M.Sc. or B.Sc. degree and high academic standing in the field (e.g. gold medalist, among top 15 students of graduating class).
An assistant professor position requires a Ph.D. in relevant field with no experience.
An associate professorship can be conducted in the fourth year of employment, although, it is becoming more common for promotion and tenure to be awarded in the sixth year of employment. The review requires a certain number 5/8/10 research publications (with at least 1/2/4 publications in the last 5 years) by the calendar years 2007/2008/2012 respectively, in HEC/PEC recognized journals.

A professor requires ten years post-PhD teaching/research experience in an HEC recognized university or a post-graduate institution or professional experience in the relevant field in a national or international organization. It requires a minimum of 8/12/15 research publications (with at least 2/3/5 publications in the last 5 years) by the calendar years 2007/2008/2012 respectively,  in HEC/PEC recognized journals

 Professor Emeritus
 Meritorious Professor/ Distinguished National Professor 
 Professor
 Associate professor 
 Assistant professor 
 Lecturer
 Lab Engineer
 Research Associate

Peru

After some recent reforms in the University Law (Minedu, 2014), the Peruvian universities (publics and privates) consider these ranks:Extraordinary Professors: Principally, this is a category of recognition for his contribution as professor or researcher when he retires or as a professional when he has built a great contribution to society throughout his career. To have 10% as maximum of these professors in any university (public or private) is mandatory.

  - For this recognition, the candidate should be faculty member (former ordinary professor in retiring process).
 Honorary professor  - For this recognition, the candidate is not related to a faculty member. For instance, in this category is the Doctor Honoris Causa.Research Professors: Principally, full-time research position with few teaching responsibilities. Research professorships are almost always funded by grants or fellowships apart from the regular university budget. He is designated because of its academic excellence. He has a special bonus of fifty percent (50%) of its total payments. The competent authority of each university evaluates every two years, the production of the ordinary professors, for their permanence as a researcher.Ordinary Professors: Often full-time (with exclusivity) professors with research competences. Principal faculty. To have 25% as minimum of these professors in any university (public or private) is mandatory.

 Full professor  - PhD and MSc required, and former Associate professor or 15 years of experience (minimum) as researcher in the field to apply.
 Associate professor  - PhD (postgraduate level) and MSc required, and former Assistant professor or 10 years of experience (minimum) as researcher in the field to apply.
 Assistant professor  - PhD (postgraduate level) and MSc required, and 5 years of experience (minimum) as researcher in the field to apply.Lecturer (Hired Professors): Often part-time (with non-exclusivity) professors. Complementary faculty. Generally, their primary employer is not the university with which they have the status. Principally, this kind of professor come from practitioner market and not develop research activities. MSc required.

In addition, the universities developed prior ranks, as junior temporary rank, to get experience and training (with strong motivation to be ordinary professor):

 Instructor (Instructor, Jefe de Práctica) - MSc required in Postgraduate level and BSc required in Undergraduate level. 
 Teaching/Research Assistant  - MSc required in Postgraduate level and BSc required in Undergraduate level.

Philippines
 Professor Emeritus
 Professor
 Associate Professor (doctorate is typically required)
 Assistant Professor (master's degree required; typically this is also the entry-level rank for PhD holders) 
 Instructor (master's degree required)
 Assistant Instructor
 Lecturer (other Universities/Colleges)
 Guest Lecturer (other Universities/Colleges)Administrative ranks (UP System;National) Chancellor/University President
 Vice Chancellor/Vice President for Planning and Development
 Vice Chancellor/Vice President for Research and Extension
 Vice Chancellor/Vice President for Academic Affairs
 Vice Chancellor/Vice President for Finance and Management
 University Registrar
 Dean
 Assistant Dean/Associate Dean
 Department Chairman/Program Chairman
 Faculty Members and StaffOther professors Professor-researcher
 Researcher
 Professor Emeritus
 Ad honorem professorTenureDue to Philippine labor laws regarding permanency, a faculty member who has not received tenure within three years of initial hire cannot continue as a full-time hire at the same university.

PolandResearch-and-teaching staff (higher rank) (pl '') – research-and-teaching assistant / research-and-teaching fellow (hold master's degree)
 (pl '') – assistant professor (requires PhD)
 (pl '') – senior lecturer (requires PhD or habilitation), (a new position, since 2007 optional and only in some universities, does not involve any research duties and is meant mainly for teaching). Until 1987 a position between assistant professor and associate professor.
 (pl '') – associate professor (requires at least PhD and significant teaching or professional or scientific or artistic achievements), according to German nomenclature sometimes called "professor extraordinarius"
 (pl '') – full professor (requires the professor title  conferred by the President of the Republic of Poland, which is an academic title, not an academic position), sometimes called "professor ordinarius"

and also for a special purpose:
 (pl '')- visiting professor
 (pl '')- professor emeritusTeaching staff: (lower rank) (pl '') – instructor (sport)
 (pl '') – instructor, foreign language teacher
 (pl '') – lecturer
 (pl '') – senior lecturer (please note the same term is used for both "docent" and "starszy wykładowca"Elected or nominated posts Rector – the principal head of the university (one per university); usually assisted by several deputy rectors (pl prorektor)
 Dean; the principal head of the faculty (one per faculty), usually assisted by several deputy deans (pl prodziekan);
 Head – the head of the institute/department/chairman (one per organizational unit)

Portugal

 Professor Catedrático (full professor) – PhD and Agregação required
 Professor Associado com Agregação (associate professor with Agregação) – PhD required
 Professor Associado (associate professor) – PhD required
 Professor Auxiliar com Agregação (assistant professor) – PhD required
 Professor Auxiliar (assistant professor) – PhD required.

Extinct ranks:
 Assistente (teaching assistant) - without a PhD
 Assistente estagiário (junior teaching assistant) - without a PhD or a master's degree

RomaniaAdministrative ranks Rector (Rector): one per university
 Prorector (Vice-rector): one or more per university
 Decan (Dean): one per college
 Prodecan (Vice-dean): one or more per college
 Director de departament (Head of department): one per department
 Șef de disciplină (Head of a subject): one for each subjectResearch-and-teaching staff (higher rank) Profesor universitar (Professor): holding a doctorate degree international-impact research activity
 Conferențiar universitar (Associate professor): holding a doctorate degree and national-impact research activity
 Lector universitar or Șef de lucrări (Assistant professor/Lecturer): holding a doctorate degree and local-impact research activity
 Asistent universitar (Teaching assistant): holding a doctorate degree (or in case of a limited time contract they can be in the process of getting a doctorate degree)Special Profesor vizitator (Visiting professor)
 Profesor emerit or Profesor consultant (Emeritus professor)

Russia

In Russia, otherwise than in the most other countries, synonimization of the terms “academic/scientific rank” and “position in academia” is not admissible, except in informal conversations. Officially, the “scientific rank” in Russia is a title which is conferred by the Higher attestation commission to the scientist after several years of a successful work in the professor (or deemed equivalent) or docent (or deemed equivalent) position. Similar traditions existed in the USSR.

RwandaAcademic ranks Full Professor
 Associate Professor
 Senior Lecturer
 Lecturer (PhD)
 Assistant Lecturer (Msc)
 Tutorial assistant (Cum Laude undergraduate assisting in teaching and research)

Saudi Arabia

 Professor أستاذ/أستاذ دكتور
 Associate Professor أستاذ مشارك
 Assistant Professor أستاذ مساعد
 Lecturer محاضر
 Demonstrator معيد

Serbia

Singapore
Singapore universities adopt a hybrid of US and British academic ranks. Faculty members on the tenure track are appointed for sustained excellence in both teaching and research. Assistant Professors are appointed on term contracts, while Associate Professors and Professors may be appointed either with tenure or on term contract. Faculty members on the Educator Track engage in high quality educational activities. They are oriented towards teaching excellence, student learning, and pedagogical research and innovation. Appointments in this Track include Teaching Assistants, Instructors, Lecturers, Senior Lecturers and Associate Professors (Educator Track). They are on term contracts which are usually of 1 – 3 years in the first instance. Research track faculty members focus on conducting fundamental research of high international quality. Appointments on this Track include Research Assistants, Research Fellows, Senior Research Fellows, Associate Professor (Research) and Professor (Research). They are on term contracts of 1 – 3 years in the first instance. Practice Track faculty members are scholar-practitioners with professional skills and expertise in industry to complement the teaching and research enterprise of the university. They also contribute significantly to the outreach activities of the School. Appointments are to Associate Professor (Practice) and Professor (Practice). They are on term contracts of 1 – 3 years in the first instance.

 Tenure Track: Assistant Professor; Associate Professor; Professor
 Educator Track: Teaching Assistant; Instructor; Lecturer; Senior Lecturer; Associate Professor (Educator Track)
 Research Track: Research Assistant; Research Fellow; Senior Research Fellow; Associate Professor (Research); Professor (Research)
 Practice Track: Associate Professor (Practice); Professor (Practice)

Slovakia

  (professor), both degree (written  before name) and position. Professors are appointed by the president after a successful accomplishment of the process of awarding a professorship. One of the requirements is an already accomplished docent degree.
  (associate professor), both degree (written  before name) and position. The degree is awarded by the rector after a certain number of years of teaching and after a successful accomplishment of habilitácia (a process concluded by a defense of a reviewed research manuscript and a public lecture).
  (lecturer / researcher), this title covers positions from lecturers to researchers. Requirements for lecturers / researchers vary, usually a Ph.D. / Th.D. is required
  (assistant lecturer), at least Master degree is requiredSpecial  (hosting professor), significant expert with whom a dean with the approval of the scientific council of a faculty concluded employment at the position of professor
  (hosting associate professor), significant expert with whom a dean with the approval of the scientific council of a faculty concluded employment at the position of associate professor
  (adjunct professor; sometimes also translated as associate professor, but it is not same position as ), associate professor temporarily appointed to the position of professor at a faculty while being an expectant to professor degree (written mimoriadny profesor after name)Administrative  (rector), head of the university
  (vice-rector), typically three to five people are vice-rectors; the position is further specified by indicating domain a vice-rector is responsible for (e. g. study-related issues, research, public relationships, international relationships, development, information technology)
  (registrar, bursar), senior professional financial administrator of the university
  (dean), head of a faculty
  (vice-dean); the position is further specified by indicating domain a vice-den is responsible for (e. g. admissions, study-related issues, research, public relationships, international relationships, information technology)
  (director), head of a sub-unit at the university or a faculty (institute, research center), e. g. Institute of Life-Long Learning of the Slovak University of Technology, Institute of Physical Education and Sport at the Pavol Jozef Šafárik University
  (departmental chairman), head of a katedra (department) – sub-unit at a faculty
  (deputy departmental chairman), deputizes department chairman if necessaryHonorary ranks  (professor emeritus), may be awarded by the rector on the proposal of the scientific council of the university for significant contributions in the field of science, art or education to professor older than 65 years who is no longer employment at the university, but is still active in research and teaching
  (honorary doctor for the sake of the honor), honorary doctorate of the university or a faculty awarded for special merit (written  before name)

Slovenia
 Asistent – assistant (Must hold at least Master (after Bologna process) or Honours degree (university diploma awarded before the Bologna process) with excellent grades, pursuing a postgraduate studies (either Doctorate / PhD studies or pre-Bologna process Magister studies). Relevant working experience or publications could be required as well)
 Asistent-raziskovalec – research assistant (Must hold at least Master (after Bologna process) or Honours degree (university diploma awarded before the Bologna process) with excellent grades, pursuing a postgraduate studies (either Doctorate / PhD studies or pre-Bologna process Magister studies). Relevant working experience or publications could be required as well)
 Lektor (usually a native speaker of a taught language)
 Docent – assistant professor (Must hold Doctorate / PhD. Relevant working experience or publications could be required as well.)
 Izredni profesor – associate professor (Must hold PhD or Doctorate and have experience of minimum of four years as a Docent)
 Redni profesor – full professor (Must hold PhD or Doctorate and have experience of minimum of four years as a docent/associate professor?)Administrative ranks Rektor – rector / chancellor / head of university
 Prorektor – prorector / vice-chancellor / head of university assistant
 Dekan – dean / head of faculty, academy or school at the university
 Prodekan – vice-dean / head of faculty, academy or school at the university
 Predstojnik oddelka – head of department; several per faculty, academy or school at the university
 Predstojnik katedre – head of cathedra/chair; several per faculty or per departmentHonorary ranks Zaslužni profesor – distinguished professor, a title bestowed to professors for their extraordinary achievements

South Africa

 Full professor
 Associate professor
 Senior Lecturer
 Soni Lecturer
 Junior Lecturer

South Korea

Protected job titles (a.k.a. tenure positions):
 (Full) professor (정교수/교수)
 Associate professor (부교수)
 Assistant professor (조교수)

Other positions:
 Lecturer (강사)
 Research professor (연구 교수)
 Clinical professor (임상 교수)
 Adjunct professor (겸임 교수)
 Teaching assistant professor ( 강의전문 조교수)
 Collegiate professor
 Visiting professor (객원 교수/초빙 교수)
 Chaired professor (석좌 교수)
 Emeritus professor (명예 교수)

Spain

 Full Professor / Catedrático de Universidad
 Associate Professor / 
 Assistant Professor / 
 Instructor (Often Part Time) / 

Sri Lanka
The appointment of professors follows the British system and is governed by the University Grants Commission regulations. A points-based system considers contributions to the research field, national development and institutional development. Several types of professorships exist:

 Professor emeritus (on retirement at the age of 65)
 Senior professor
 Professor
 Associate professor

Professor positions are clearly separated from other junior faculty positions such as, in seniority order: senior lecturer (grade I) (usually PhD and 6+ years service), senior lecturer (grade II) (usually a PhD and 2+ years service), lecturer (usually with PhD), lecturer (probationary), Temporary lecturer.

 Professor emeritus (on retirement)
 Senior professor
 Professor
 Associate professor 
 Senior lecturer
 Lecturer
 Temporary lecturer
 Instructor/ demonstrator
 Student instructor (undergrad)Administrative ranks Chancellor (titular)
 Vice-chancellor/president
 Registrar
 Deans of faculties
 Heads of departments/schools
 Directors of Postgraduate Institutes

Sudan

 Professor أستاذ
 Associate Professor أستاذ مشارك
 Assistant Professor أستاذ مساعد
 Lecturer محاضر
 Teaching Assistant مساعد تدريس

SwedenAcademic ranks Docent (Associate professor, normally unpaid title, equivalent to habilitation)
 Adjungerad professor (Visiting/adjunct professor, part-time, non-tenured)
 Adjunkt (Instructor-lecturer, without Ph.D., permanent teaching position)
 Forskarassistent (post-doctoral research assistant, non-tenured)
 Biträdande Lektor (assistant professor, tenure-track)
 Lektor (assistant professor, with Ph.D, tenured)
 Professor (full professor, tenured)
 Professor Emeritus (professor emeritus) 
 Director musices (Director Musices)Administrative ranks President (Rektor)
 Deputy President (Prorektor)
 Dean (Dekan)
 Vice Dean (Prodekanus)
 Head of Department (Prefekt)
 Deputy Head of Department (Proprefekt)Honorary titles Honorary doctor (Hedersdoktor)
 Honorary Fellow (Honorary Fellow)

Switzerland

German-language universities

 Ordentlicher Professor/Ordentliche Professorin, Ordinarius/Ordinaria: full professor 
 Ausserordentlicher Professor/Ausserordentliche Professorin, Extraordinarius/Extraordinaria: associate professor 
 Assistenzprofessor/Assistenzprofessorin: assistant professor (requires PhD)
 Assoziierter Professor/Assoziierte Professorin: adjunct professor 
 Titularprofessor/Titularprofessorin: affiliated professor
 Honorarprofessor/Honorarprofessorin: honorary professor
 Privatdozent/Privatdozentin (PD): senior lecturer (has the habilitation but not professorship)
 Gastdozent/Gastdozentin: visiting lecturer
 Lehrbeauftragter/Lehrbeauftragte: lecturer 
 Oberassistent/Oberassistentin: senior researcher/lecturer (typically after 3-4 years as a postdoc)
 Postdoc: Postdoc (i.e., after PhD)
 Wissenschaftlicher Mitarbeiter/Wissenschaftliche Mitarbeiterin: Scientific Staff (Note: typically synonymous with "Assistent/Assistentin")
 Assistent/Assistentin: research assistant (typically a PhD student)
 Hilfassistent/Hilfassistentin: Undergraduate research assistant / Undergraduate teaching assistant

French-language universities
 Professeur ordinaire (full professor, chairman)
 Professeur extraordinaire
 Professeur invité
 Professeur associé (associate professor literally, yet functions as full professor or reader, non-chairman, tenured)
 Professeur assistant (assistant professor literally, yet functions as associate professor, tenure-track)
 Chargé de cours (senior lecturer, yet functions as associate professor, tenure-track)
 Privat docent (has the habilitation but not professorship, required for tenure-track)
 Chargé d'enseignement (lecturer, not tenure-track) 
 Maître-Assistant (assistant professor or lecturer, non-tenured)
 Assistant (lecturer, usually a graduate student)
 Moniteur (undergraduate student)

Syria
The academic rankings in the Syrian Arab Republic are very similar to the Egyptian ones; see Academic ranks in Egypt for details.

Taiwan
 Professor emeritus (名譽教授)
 Professor (教授）
 Associate professor (副教授)
 Assistant professor（助理教授) (assistant professor and above are mainly for people who hold a PhD degree. Some are promoted to this rank by distinctive industrial performance.)
 Lecturer
 Adjunct professor
 Adjunct associate professor
 Adjunct assistant professor (According to the contract work, and less welfare. Usually 1 to 2 years.)
 Adjunct researcher

Thailand

 Professor (ศาสตราจารย์)
 Associate professor (รองศาสตราจารย์)
 Assistant professor (ผู้ช่วยศาสตราจารย์)
 Lecturer (อาจารย์)

Trinidad and Tobago
 Professor Emeritus
 Professor
 Senior Lecturer
 Lecturer
 Assistant Lecturer
 Instructor
 Graduate/Research Assistant

Tunisia
  (full professor)
  (full professor)
  (professor)
  (associate professor, tenured)
  (assistant professor, tenure-track)
  (visiting assistant professor, non-tenured)
  (associate professor, tenured)
  (research director, appointed by federal research council FNRS)
  (senior researcher with teaching aggregation, with Ph.D.)
  (senior researcher, with Ph.D., appointed by federal research council FNRS)
  (senior researcher, with Ph.D.)
  (senior researcher., appointed by federal research council FNRS)
  (senior research assistant, with Ph.D.)
  (researcher, appointed by federal research council FNRS)
  (research assistant)Administrative ranks Recteur (president of university)
 Vice-Recteur
 Doyen (dean, i.e. head of a faculty, elected)
 Président d'institut (director of research institute, elected)
 Vice-Doyen (vice-dean, i.e. head of studies in a faculty)
 Président de département (department head, elected)

TurkeyAcademic ranks Emeritus Profesör, (Honorary Retired professor)
 Ordinaryus Profesör, (At least 5 years professor with a chair, representing a given area. Since 1960, this title is not given.)
 Profesör, (Full professor)
 Doçent, (Associate professor)
 Dr.Öğretim Üyesi, (Assistant Professor)
 Öğretim Görevlisi, (Lecturer)
 Okutman, (Instructor)
 Araştırma Görevlisi, (Research/teaching assistant)Administrative ranks Rektör, rector or president (professors)
 Rektör Yardımcısı, vice-rector or vice-president (professors)
 Fakülte Dekanı, dean of the faculty (professors)
 Enstitü müdürü, Director of the institute (doctorate or above for research institutes, professors for graduate education institutes)
 Dekan Yardımcısı, vice-dean or associate dean (associate professor or above)
 Enstitü müdür yardımcısı, Deputy director of the institute (associate professor or above)
 Bölüm Başkanı, head of department (doctorate or above)
 Yüksekokul Müdürü, head of school (doctorate or above)
 Ana Bilim/Sanat Dalı Başkanı, chairman of academic programs (doctorate or above)

UkraineAcademic ranks Profesor / Професор (Full professor)
 Dotsent / Доцент (Associate professor)
 Starshyj doslidnyk (starshyj naukovyj spivrobitnyk) / Старший дослідник (старший науковий співробітник) (Senior researcher, Senior research fellow)
 Starshyj vykladach / Старший викладач (Senior lecturer)
 Vykladach / Викладач (Lecturer)
 Asystent / Асистент (Assistant professor)Administrative ranks Rektor / Ректор, rector or president (professors)
 Prorektor / Проректор, vice-rector or vice-president (professors)
 Dyrektor instytutu / centru / Директор інституту / центру, Director of the institute / centre (assistant professor or above)
 Dekan Fakultetu / Декан факультету, dean of the faculty (associate professor or above)
 Zastupnyk dekana/dyrektora / Заступник декана/директора, vice-dean or associate dean (associate professor or above) / deputy director of the institute (assistant professor or above)
 Zaviduvach kafedry / Завідувач кафедри, head of department (assistant professor or above)
 Zaviduvach laboratoriji / Завідувач лабораторії, head of laboratory (assistant professor or above)
  Zaviduvach sekciji kafedry / Завідувач секції кафедри, chairman of academic programs (assistant professor or above)

United KingdomResearch and teaching career pathway Professor/Chair
 Reader (or Principal Lecturer in some post-1992 institutions)
 Senior lecturer
 Lecturer, clinical lecturer
 Assistant lecturer, demonstrator, seminar leader, associate lecturer, graduate teaching assistant, departmental lecturerResearch career pathway Professor/professorial research fellow/research professor
 Reader
 Senior research fellow/Senior researcher
 Research fellow, Research associate
 Research assistantTechnical career pathway Principal technologist, Departmental manager/coordinator 
 Senior chief technologist, Lab manager/coordinator  
 Chief technician
 Senior technician
 Advanced technician 
 Technician 
 Junior technician, apprentice technician 
 Trainee technicianTeaching career pathway'
 Senior Tutor
 Professorial teaching fellow
 Senior teaching fellow
 Teaching fellow
 Teaching associate

United States

Venezuela
Board Of Trustees 
President
Vice President, Student and Community Services
Vice President, Instruction
Vice President, Strategy, Relations and Communications
Dean, Student and Community Services
Dean, Instruction
Dean, Strategy, Relations and Communications
Executive Director, Student and Community Services
Executive Director, Instruction
Executive Director, Strategy, Relations and Communications
Director, Student and Community Services
Director, Instruction
Director, Strategy, Relations and Communications
Support
Applications
Records Managements
Academic Testing
Placement online testing 
Safety
Student

Zimbabwe
Board Of Trustees 
President
Vice President, Student and Community Services
Vice President, Instruction
Vice President, Strategy, Relations and Communications
Dean, Student and Community Services
Dean, Instruction
Dean, Strategy, Relations and Communications
Executive Director, Student and Community Services
Executive Director, Instruction
Executive Director, Strategy, Relations and Communications
Director, Student and Community Services
Director, Instruction
Director, Strategy, Relations and Communications
Support
Applications
Records Managements
Academic Testing
Placement and online testing 
Safety
Student

Notes

References

External links
 Academic careers by country

Rank